Zelig Eshhar is an Israeli immunologist at the Weizmann Institute of Science and the Tel Aviv Sourasky Medical Center. He was Chairman of the Department of Immunology at the Weizmann Institute twice, in the 1990s and 2000s.

Biography
Zelig Lipka (later Eshhar) grew up in Rehovot. After his IDF service in Nahal, he joined Kibbutz Yad Mordechai, where he became a beekeeper. He received his B.Sc. and M.Sc. from the Hebrew University of Jerusalem, and his Ph.D. from the Weizmann Institute.

Medical research
He is mainly known for his studies on T cells and his pioneering work on chimeric antigen receptors. 
His work has been the basis of the development of a cancer immunotherapy, involving genetic modifications of T lymphocytes extracted from a cancer patient to produce chimeric antigen receptor (CAR) T-Cells, which are then injected back into the patient in a process called adoptive cell transfer, that produced startlingly good results in clinical trials in the mid-2010s and millions of dollars of investment.

Awards and recognition
In 2013 Eshhar was awarded the CAR Pioneering award by the ATTACK European Consortium as well as the European Society of Gene & Cell Therapy Outstanding Achievement Award. In 2014 he shared the Massry Prize with Steven Rosenberg and James P. Allison and the Pioneer Award with Carl H. June. He is the recipient of the 2015 Israel Prize in Life Sciences and the 2019 Cancer Research Institute's William B. Coley Award. In 2021 he was awarded the Dan David Prize.

See also
Science and technology in Israel
Healthcare in Israel

References

Year of birth missing (living people)
Living people
Hebrew University of Jerusalem alumni
Israel Prize in life sciences recipients
Israeli immunologists
Massry Prize recipients
Academic staff of Weizmann Institute of Science